Mondo candido is a 1975 black comedy film directed by acclaimed Mondo directors Gualtiero Jacopetti and Franco Prosperi. The film is a liberal adaptation of Voltaire's 1759 novel Candide.

Plot
Candido (Christopher Brown) is a naïve young man raised by a Westphalian baron (Gianfranco D'Angelo) in the castle of Thunder-ten-Tronckh. He is a devoted disciple of his tutor Dr. Pangloss (Jacques Herlin), a philosopher who instructs him with a purely optimistic moral doctrine. Candido cannot hide his feelings for the Baron's raunchy daughter Cunegonda (Michelle Miller), and one day the Baron discovers them in intimacy. Outraged by this gesture, he punishes the girl and expels the young man from the court.

Having stumbled upon a camp of Bulgarian soldiers, the orphan is deceived and forced into useless and dangerous experiments on human flight. Candido manages to escape and, during the journey, meets Pangloss. The master informs him that the castle was attacked by a gang of motorcyclists who killed the Baron and the Baroness, and raped Cunegonda.

Later, the two are imprisoned by the Holy Inquisition. The tutor is sentenced to death for his utopian ideas, while to the boy suffers corporal punishment. Among the high-ranking people who attend the executions is Cunegonda, forced to be the lover of the head of the Tribunal. After the young lovers briefly reunite, the inquisitor arrives and, to avoid being hanged, Candido has to escape again, accompanied by his new friend Cacambo, a slave who has escaped from his master. The two embark for the New World "where all are equal".

In today's New York City, Candido finds Pangloss, who also escaped the gallows and now works as a television director. Always in search of Cunegonda, the protagonist and Cacambo travel first in Northern Ireland, devastated by the clashes between Catholics and Protestants, then in a military camp for Israeli female soldiers, during the Arab–Israeli conflict. Here, Candido learns that Cunegonda has fled with a fedayeen. After further ups and downs, the young man finally manages to reunite with his loved one.

Cast
 Christopher Brown: Candido
 Jacques Herlin: Dr. Pangloss
 Michelle Miller: Cunegonda
 José Quaglio: Inquisitor
 Steffen Zacharias: Sage
 Gianfranco D'Angelo: Baron 
 Salvatore Baccaro: Ogre 
 Alessandro Haber: A lover of Cunegonda 
 Giancarlo Badessi: Spanish governor
 Richard Domphe: Cacambò

Reception 
 comments Mondo Candido as "a visionary work without a precise narrative structure - resembling a certain surrealist production by Alejandro Jodorowski - the film is difficult to categorise in a defined genre, nor does it aspire to be".

References

External links 
 

Mondo candido at Filmaffinity
Mondo candido at Mymovies.it

1975 films
Italian comedy films
1970s Italian-language films
Films directed by Gualtiero Jacopetti
1970s black comedy films
Adaptations of works by Voltaire
Candide
Films based on French novels
Films scored by Riz Ortolani
1975 comedy films
1975 drama films
1970s Italian films